Sanzinia madagascariensis, also known as the Madagascar tree boa or Malagasy tree boa, is a boa species endemic to the island of Madagascar. It was once considered conspecific with the Nosy Komba ground boa (Sanzinia volontany). Like all other boas, it is non-venomous.

Description
 Adults average 4–5 feet (122–152 cm) in length, although 6–7 foot (183–213 cm) specimens are not uncommon. Thermoreceptive pits are located between the labial scales. Females are larger than males.

It is greenish in colour and is found on the eastern side of Madagascar.

Distribution and habitat
Endemic to Madagascar. The type locality given is "Madagascar". Favors trees and shrubs near streams, rivers, ponds and swamps.

Conservation status
This species was classified as Vulnerable (VU) on the IUCN Red List of Threatened Species in 2006 with the following criteria: A1cd (v2.3, 1994). This means that a population reduction of at least 20% has been observed, estimated, inferred or suspected over the last 10 years or three generations, whichever is the longer, based on a decline in area of occupancy, extent of occurrence and/or quality of habitat, and based on actual or potential levels of exploitation.
It is now listed as Least Concern (LC) as it is widespread, present in heavily degraded habitats and it is not subject to any known or suspected threats.

Also listed as CITES Appendix I, which means that it is threatened with extinction and CITES prohibits international trade except when the purpose of the import is not commercial, for example for scientific research.

Feeding
Arboreal and generally nocturnal, S. madagascariensis feeds on mammals and birds. Its thermoreceptive pits help it to locate its prey. It will also leave the trees to actively hunt for small mammals on the ground.

Reproduction
Ovoviviparous, females give birth to up to 12 young at a time, each about 15 inches (38 cm) in length.

When females become gravid, their skin color darkens. This adaptation provides increased heat absorption for the developing young. After giving birth, the color returns to normal as soon as the female next sheds her skin. Neonates are a bright red that may warn predators to "stay away", while simultaneously providing camouflage among brightly colored treetop flowers.

Taxonomy
When Kluge (1991) moved Sanzinia madagascariensis (A.M.C. Duméril & Bibron, 1844) to Boa together with Acrantophis madagascariensis (A.M.C. Duméril & Bibron, 1844), it resulted in homonymy. To fix this nomenclatural problem, he proposed the specific name manditra as a replacement for S. madagascariensis.

It has since been shown that the Madagascar boids and the ones of the genus Boa do not form a monophyletic group, so that the lumping of Sanzinia, Acrantophis and Boa was incorrect, and the name Sanzinia madagascariensis is therefore the correct name for this species.

References

Further reading

Boulenger GA. 1893. Catalogue of the Snakes in the British Museum (Natural History). Volume I., Containing the Families ..., Boidæ, ... London: Trustees of the British Museum (Natural History). (Taylor and Francis, printers). xiii + 448 pp. + Plates I-XXVIII. (Corallus madagascariensis, 103-104).
Duméril A-M-C, Bibron G. 1844. Erpétologie générale ou Histoire naturelle complète des Reptiles, Tome sixième. Paris: Roret. xii + 609 pp. (Xiphosoma madagascariense, pp. 549–552).
Gray JE. 1849. Catalogue of the Specimens of Snakes in the British Museum. London: Trustees of the British Museum. (Edward Newman, printer). xv + 125 pp. (Sanzinia madagascariensis, p. 99).
 Kluge AG. 1991. Boine Snake Phylogeny and Research Cycles. Misc. Pub. Museum of Zoology, Univ. of Michigan No. 178. 58 pp. PDF at University of Michigan Library. Accessed 11 July 2008.
 Vences M, Glaw F. 2003. Phylogeography, systematics and conservation status of boid snakes from Madagascar (Sanzinia and Acrantophis). Salamandra, Reinbach, 39(3/4): p. 181-206. PDF at Miguel Vences. Accessed 29 August 2008.

External links

 

Sanzinia
Reptiles described in 1844
Reptiles of Madagascar
Endemic fauna of Madagascar
Taxa named by André Marie Constant Duméril
Taxa named by Gabriel Bibron